is a city located in Miyazaki Prefecture, Japan. The city was founded on November 3, 1954. As of June 1, 2019, the city has an estimated population of 17,457 and a population density of 59.1 persons per km2.

The city is served by the Nichinan Line of the JR Kyūshū railway system, which links it to the west to Shibushi in neighbouring Kagoshima Prefecture and to the north to the prefectural capital, Miyazaki.

Within the boundaries of the municipality (but some distance from its main built-up areas) lies the island of Kōjima, known for the field studies site of the Primate Research Institute, where studies on wild-living Japanese macaque monkeys are carried out.

Koigaura is a surfing spot in Kushima. Every year, in the summer, surfers from all over the country visit this beautiful place.

Geography

Climate
Kushima has a humid subtropical climate (Köppen climate classification Cfa) with hot, humid summers and cool winters.

Demographics
Per Japanese census data, the population of Kushima in 2020 is 16,822 people. Kushima has been conducting censuses since 1920.

References

External links 
 Kushima City official website 

Cities in Miyazaki Prefecture
Populated places established in 1954
1954 establishments in Japan